Surrey Heath Borough Council the local authority for Surrey Heath borough within the county of Surrey is elected every four years.  Since the latest boundary changes in 2017, 35 councillors are elected to 14 wards of which seven are three member and the remainder are two member.

Political control

Leadership
The leaders of the council since 1996 have been:

Council elections
1973 Surrey Heath Borough Council election
1976 Surrey Heath Borough Council election (New ward boundaries)
1979 Surrey Heath Borough Council election
1983 Surrey Heath Borough Council election
1987 Surrey Heath Borough Council election (Borough boundary changes took place but the number of seats remained the same)
1991 Surrey Heath Borough Council election (Borough boundary changes took place but the number of seats remained the same)
1995 Surrey Heath Borough Council election
1999 Surrey Heath Borough Council election
2003 Surrey Heath Borough Council election (New ward boundaries)
2007 Surrey Heath Borough Council election
2011 Surrey Heath Borough Council election
2015 Surrey Heath Borough Council election
2019 Surrey Heath Borough Council election (New ward boundaries)

By-election results

2007-2011

2011-2015

2019-2023

External links
Surrey Heath Borough Council

References

 
Council elections in Surrey
District council elections in England